In geometry of normed spaces, the Holmes–Thompson volume is a notion of volume that allows to compare sets contained in different normed spaces (of the same dimension). It was introduced by Raymond D. Holmes and Anthony Charles Thompson.

Definition

Symplectic (coordinate-free) definition

The Holmes–Thompson volume can be defined without coordinates: if  is a measurable set in an n-dimensional real normed space  then its Holmes–Thompson volume is defined as the absolute value of the integral of the volume form  over the set ,

whose integral over the set  is just the usual volume of the set in the coordinate space .

Volume in Finsler manifolds

More generally, the Holmes–Thompson volume of a measurable set  in a Finsler manifold  can be defined as

Holmes–Thompson's definition of volume is appropriate for establishing links between the total volume of a manifold and the length of the geodesics (shortest curves) contained in it (such as systolic inequalities and filling volumes) because, according to Liouville's theorem, the geodesic flow preserves the symplectic volume of sets in the cotangent bundle.

Computation using coordinates 

The Finsler metric is a continuous function  that yields a (possibly asymmetric) norm  for each point . The Holmes–Thompson volume of a subset  can be computed as

 

This formula follows, again, from the fact that the -form  is equal (up to a sign) to the product of the differentials of all  coordinates  and their dual coordinates .

Santaló's formula

If  is a simple region in a Finsler manifold (that is, a region homeomorphic to a ball, with convex boundary and a unique geodesic along  joining each pair of points of ), then its Holmes–Thompson volume can be computed in terms of the path-length distance (along ) between the boundary points of  using Santaló's formula, which in turn is based on the fact that the geodesic flow on the cotangent bundle is Hamiltonian.

Normalization and comparison with Euclidean and Hausdorff measure

The original authors used a different normalization for Holmes–Thompson volume. They divided the value given here by the volume of the Euclidean n-ball, to make Holmes–Thompson volume coincide with the product measure in the standard Euclidean space . This article does not follow that convention.

If the Holmes–Thompson volume in normed spaces (or Finsler manifolds) is normalized, then it never exceeds the Hausdorff measure. This is a consequence of the Blaschke-Santaló inequality. The equality holds if and only if the space is Euclidean (or a Riemannian manifold).

References

Normed spaces
Differential geometry
Measure theory
Finsler geometry
Integral geometry
Systolic geometry